Société d'Encouragement au Progrès is a NGO fighting for initiative, responsibility and progress headquartered in Paris (France). It publishes a quarterly review called La Tribune du Progrès.

In 2009, the article "Cancer: curing is good, preventing is better" awarded André Gernez.

Founders 
Albert Lebrun
Paul Painlevé
Louis Cailletet
Lumière brothers
Edouard Belin
Edouard Branly

Notes

External links
Albert Masri presentation

Scientific organizations based in France